Seyyedlar-e Olya (also Romanized as Seyyedlar-e ‘Olyā) is a village in Seyyedan Rural District, Abish Ahmad District, Kaleybar County, East Azerbaijan Province, Iran. At the 2006 census, its population was 37, in 9 families.

References 

Populated places in Kaleybar County